The Comp Air CA12 is a turboprop-powered civil utility aircraft, currently under development. Comp Air is seeking certification. It is configured as a conventional, low-wing monoplane with tricycle undercarriage.  The first flight was on April 14, 2007.

Specifications (as designed)

See also

External links
 

12
2000s United States civil utility aircraft
Single-engined turboprop aircraft
Low-wing aircraft
Single-engined tractor aircraft